Frederik Batti Sorring, also known by FBS (28 May 1955 - 21 December 2020), was an Indonesian politician and member of the Democratic Party. He served as the Regent of North Toraja Regency, a predominantly Torajan region of South Sulawesi, from 2011 until 2016. Prior to that office, Batti Sorring also served as the first Vice Regent of Asmat Regency in Papua province from 2005 to 2010.

Biography
Batti Sorring was born on 28 May 1955, in Tanna Toraja Regency. He served as the Vice Regent of Asmat Regency in Western New Guinea from 2005 to 2010 under Regent Yuvensius Alfonsius Biakai.

Batti Sorring was elected Regent of North Toraja in 2010, together with his running mate for vice regent, Frederik Buntang Rombelayuk. They took office in March 2011 and served until 2016.

In December 2020, Batti Sorring tested positive for COVID-19 during the COVID-19 pandemic in Indonesia. He died from complications of COVID-19 at Grestelina Hospital in Makassar around 3:15 a.m. on 21 December 2020, at the age of 65.

Batti Sorring was buried in Kurra district in Tana Toraja Regency, South Sulawesi.

References

1955 births
2020 deaths
Mayors and regents of places in South Sulawesi
Regents of places in Indonesia
Democratic Party (Indonesia) politicians
People from North Toraja Regency
Hasanuddin University alumni
Torajan people
Deaths from the COVID-19 pandemic in Indonesia